Ashton-Phillip Shawn Götz (born 16 July 1993) is a German footballer who plays as a right-back for SV Drochtersen/Assel.

Club career 
Götz is a youth product from Hamburger SV. In 2011, he made his debut for the reserve team. He made his Bundesliga debut in the club's first team on 24 September 2014 against Borussia Mönchengladbach. He replaced Dennis Diekmeier in overtime in a 1–0 away defeat.

In May 2017, he was suspended by the coach of Hamburg's first team, Markus Gisdol, and subsequently, his contract with the first team was dissolved.

International career
Götz was born in Germany to an African American father and a German mother, and was scouted to perhaps join the United States men's national soccer team.

References

External links 
 
 

1993 births
Living people
People from Pirmasens
German people of American descent
German people of African-American descent
German footballers
Association football midfielders
Bundesliga players
Regionalliga players
Eredivisie players
Hamburger SV players
Hamburger SV II players
Roda JC Kerkrade players
SV Drochtersen/Assel players
German expatriate footballers
German expatriate sportspeople in the Netherlands
Expatriate footballers in the Netherlands
Footballers from Rhineland-Palatinate